Stenocranus lautus is a species of delphacid planthopper in the family Delphacidae. It is found in the Caribbean and North America.

References

Further reading

External links

 

Articles created by Qbugbot
Insects described in 1897
Stenocraninae